Vulcaniella kabulensis is a moth of the family Cosmopterigidae. It is endemic to Afghanistan.

The length of the forewings of the male is c. 4 mm.

External links
Notes on the Cosmopterigidae (Lepidoptera) of Afghanistan and Jammu & Kashmir, India with descriptions of two new species

Vulcaniella
Endemic fauna of Afghanistan
Moths described in 2008